The Subprefecture of Penha is one of 32 subprefectures of the city of São Paulo, Brazil.  It comprises four districts: Penha, Cangaíba, Vila Matilde, and Artur Alvim.

References

Subprefectures of São Paulo